Marfa Boretskaya, also known as Martha the Mayoress ( - Marfa Posadnitsa), was the wife of Isaac Boretsky, Novgorod's posadnik in 1438–1439 and again in 1453. According to legend and historical tradition, she led the republic's struggle against Muscovy between her husband's death and the city's eventual annexation by Ivan III of Russia in 1478.

Biography 

While she is referred to as Mayoress, this was in no way a formal office. Russians and other Slavs traditionally refer to the wife of certain officials by the feminine equivalent, hence the priest's (pop) wife may be referred to a "priestess" or a general's wife may be referred to a "general-ess" without it meaning that she herself exercised any actual power.  In the case of Marfa, she may have been the focal point of the anti-Muscovite faction and had considerable charisma or influence as the matriarch of the clan, but never held actual office in Novgorod as they were confined to the male land-owners.  

Little is known of Marfa's personal life.  She was widowed at some time in the 1460s and remained one of the wealthiest Novgorodian landowners (based on the Pistsovye Knigi or land cadasters compiled by Muscovite officials beginning in the 1490s) until Ivan III's confiscations of land in the 1470s and 80s.  It was probably to defend her wealth that she opposed the Muscovite grand princes who had sought to take over Novgorodian estates going back into the late 14th century.

In 1471 Marfa and her sons, Dmitrii and Fedor, as the last representatives of the anti-Muscovite Boretsky family, attempted to negotiate with Casimir IV Jagiellon the terms of the city's handover to the Grand Duchy of Lithuania, provided that the city's ancient privileges and rights will be retained. They also invited Mikhailo Olelkovich to become city's ruler. On hearing about Marfa's manoeuvres, which violated the earlier Treaty of Yazhelbitsy, Ivan III advanced against Novgorod and defeated the Novgorodian volunteer army in the Battle of Shelon. In the wake of this disaster, Marfa's son, Dmitrii was executed on July 24, 1471 at the behest of the grand prince. 

Although she continued to rely on Lithuania's support and intrigue against Moscow, Ivan III finally subjugated Novgorod seven years later. Marfa and her grandsons were then taken into custody and escorted to Moscow (February 7, 1478); her lands were confiscated. According to tradition, Marfa was forced to take the veil in Nizhny Novgorod, but Gail Lenhoff argues that her fate after her arrest is uncertain, as are the date and circumstances of her death.

Assessment and memory 
More recent research argues that Marfa was scapegoated by Archbishop Feofil of Novgorod (1470–1480) to disguise his role in Novgorod's failure to fulfill its treaty obligations.  The story of Marfa's duplicitous behavior toward the grand prince was apparently first written down in the archbishop's scriptorium in Novgorod in the mid to late 1470s.

Marfa's tragic career and struggle for the republican government won her a good deal of sympathy and attention from Russian writers and historians, especially those with a romantic streak. She was fictionalized in Nikolai Karamzin's short novel Martha the Mayoress, or the Fall of Novgorod as well as in a book by Fedotov entitled Marfa Posadnitsa. Her career fascinated Pushkin who dedicated his 1830 essay to her.  Sergey Esenin wrote a historical poem about Marfa the Mayoress in 1914.

Marfa's statue is part of the Millennium of Russia Monument in Novgorod.

References 

Posadniks of Novgorod
15th-century Russian people
15th-century women rulers
15th-century Russian women